The Porsche Indy V8 engine is a 90-degree, four-stroke, single-turbocharged, 2.65-liter, V-8 Indy car racing engine, designed, developed and produced by Porsche, for use in the CART PPG Indy Car World Series; between 1980 and 1990. The engine was used in March chassis cars.

Applications
Interscope IR01
Porsche 2708
March 88C
March 89P
March 90P

References

Engines by model
Gasoline engines by model
Porsche
IndyCar Series
Champ Car
V8 engines
Porsche in motorsport